The following is the list of squads that took place in the women's field hockey tournament at the 1996 Summer Olympics.

Argentina
The following players represented Argentina:

 Mariana Arnal
 Sofía MacKenzie
 Magdalena Aicega
 Silvina Corvalán
 Anabel Gambero
 Julieta Castellán
 Gabriela Pando
 Gabriela Sánchez
 Vanina Oneto
 Jorgelina Rimoldi
 Karina Masotta
 María Castelli
 Verónica Artica
 Cecilia Rognoni
 Ayelén Stepnik
 Mariana González

Australia
The following players represented Australia:

 Clover Maitland
 Danni Roche
 Liane Tooth
 Alyson Annan
 Juliet Haslam
 Jenny Morris
 Louise Dobson
 Lisa Powell-Carruthers
 Karen Marsden
 Kate Starre
 Renita Farrell-Garard
 Jackie Pereira
 Nova Peris-Kneebone
 Rechelle Hawkes
 Triny Powell
 Michelle Andrews

Germany
The following players represented Germany:

 Susanne Wollschläger
 Birgit Beyer
 Vanessa van Kooperen
 Tanja Dickenscheid
 Nadine Ernsting-Krienke
 Simone Thomaschinski-Gräßer
 Irina Kuhnt
 Melanie Cremer
 Franziska Hentschel
 Tina Peters
 Eva Hagenbäumer
 Britta Becker
 Natascha Keller
 Philippa Suxdorf
 Heike Lätzsch
 Katrin Kauschke

Great Britain
The following players represented Great Britain:

 Jo Thompson
 Hilary Rose
 Christine Cook
 Tina Cullen
 Karen Brown
 Jill Atkins
 Sue Fraser
 Rhona Simpson
 Mandy Nichols-Nicholson
 Jane Sixsmith
 Pauline Robertson
 Joanne Mould
 Tammy Miller
 Anna Bennett
 Mandy Davies
 Kath Johnson

Netherlands
The following players represented the Netherlands:

 Jacqueline Toxopeus
 Stella de Heij
 Fleur van de Kieft
 Carole Thate
 Ellen Kuipers
 Jeannette Lewin
 Nicole Koolen
 Dillianne van den Boogaard
 Margje Teeuwen
 Mijntje Donners
 Willemijn Duyster
 Suzanne Plesman
 Noor Holsboer
 Florentine Steenberghe
 Wietske de Ruiter
 Suzan van der Wielen

South Korea
The following players represented South Korea:

 You Jae-sook
 Choi Eun-kyung
 Cho Eun-jung
 Oh Seung-shin
 Lim Jeong-sook
 Kim Myung-ok
 Chang Eun-jung
 Lee Ji-young
 Lee Eun-kyung
 Kwon Soo-hyun
 Woo Hyun-jung
 Choi Mi-soon
 Lee Eun-young
 Jeon Young-sun
 Kwon Chang-sook
 Jin Deok-san

Spain
The following players represented Spain:

 Elena Carrión
 Natalia Dorado
 María Cruz González
 Carmen Barea
 Silvia Manrique
 Nagore Gabellanes
 Teresa Motos
 Sonia Barrio
 Mónica Rueda
 Lucía López
 María del Mar Feito
 Maider Tellería
 Elena Urkizu
 Begoña Larzabal
 Sonia de Ignacio
 Mariví González

United States
The following players represented the United States:

 Patty Shea
 Laurel Martin
 Liz Tchou
 Marcia Pankratz
 Cindy Werley
 Diane Madl
 Kris Fillat
 Kelli James
 Tracey Fuchs
 Antoinette Lucas
 Katie Kauffman
 Andrea Wieland
 Leslie Lyness
 Barb Marois
 Jill Reeve
 Pamela Bustin

References

1996